Metal Morph is a video game developed by Origin Systems and published by FCI, Inc. for the Super Nintendo Entertainment System.

Gameplay
The gameplay alternates between run and gun and scrolling shooter (playing as a space ship). Both the player character and his space ship are able to use MetalMorphosis (a transformation ability) to navigate certain areas. The player must retrieve missing pieces of the ship, while simultaneously fending off aliens who desire the secret of MetalMorphosis.

Reception
GamePro gave the game a positive review, commenting that the game's two play styles complement each other, the controls are responsive and accurate, the graphics are attractive, and the music and sound effects suit the game's tone. However, they concluded that buying the game is pointless, since the game's level select and non-randomized levels allow the player to see everything the game has to offer on a single rental.

References

External links
Metal Morph at Gamespot.com
Metal Morph at GameFAQs

1994 video games
North America-exclusive video games
Run and gun games
Science fiction video games
Scrolling shooters
Super Nintendo Entertainment System games
Super Nintendo Entertainment System-only games
Origin Systems games
Video games scored by Jeff van Dyck
Video games scored by Martin Galway
Video games developed in the United States

Single-player video games